Roy Bradshaw is a British figure skater who competed in ice dance.

With partner Susan Getty, he won bronze at the 1971 European Figure Skating Championships in Zurich, Switzerland.

Competitive highlights 
With Susan Getty

References 

British male ice dancers